The 2016 West Alabama Tigers football team represented the University of West Alabama in the 2016 NCAA Division II football season. They were led by head coach Brett Gilliland, who was in his third season at West Alabama. The Tigers played their home games at Tiger Stadium and were members of the Gulf South Conference. They finished the season with a record of 7 wins and 4 losses (7–4 overall, 6–2 in the GSC), defeating two top-25-ranked teams and were not invited in the 2016 playoffs.

Schedule
West Alabama announced its 2016 football schedule on February 16, 2016. The schedule consists of both five home and six away games in the regular season. The Tigers hosted GSC foes Delta State, Florida Tech, North Alabama, and Valdosta State and traveled to Mississippi College, Shorter, West Florida, and West Georgia

The Tigers only hosted one of the three non-conference games against Malone Pioneers of the Great Midwest Athletic Conference and traveled to two games against North Greenville which is independent from a conference and Stephen F. Austin of the Southland Conference.

References

West Alabama
West Alabama Tigers football seasons
West Alabama Tigers football